Pseudoedaleosia is a genus of moth in the family Noctuidae.

Species
 Pseudoedaleosia scoparioides Strand, 1924

References
Natural History Museum Lepidoptera generic names catalog
Pseudoedaleosia at funet

Hadeninae